The locality of Shamatak Grande is in the El Cenepa District in the department of Amazonas, Peru.

References 

Populated places in the Amazonas Region